The City of Dubuque, Iowa maintains an extensive park system. Because of Dubuque's varied topography, several of the parks feature panoramic views of the city, including: Cleveland Park, Eagle Point Park, Madison Park, and Murphy Park. The city currently operates 39 parks, 6 trails, 2 swimming pools, a golf course, arboretum, campground, and 3 other properties.

In recent years, the city's park system has been greatly expanded. Many new neighborhood "mini" parks and playgrounds have been built, and all of the existing parks have been renovated since the mid-1990s. Currently, 8 parks are in some phase of development. The city is also working on an interconnected hike/bike trail system that will, at first, link up various riverfront attractions, such as those in the Port of Dubuque. Eventually, the system will be expanded into the outlying neighborhoods, including a trail in the Catfish Creek Valley.

Parks

List of parks

Allison-Henderson Park
Avon Park
A.Y. McDonald Park
Bergfeld Recreation Area
Bee Branch Greenway
Burden Park
Cancer Survivor Park
Cleveland Park
Comiskey Park
Dog Park
Eagle Point Park
Falk Park
Flat Iron Park
Flora Park
Gay Park
Grant Park
Harvest View Park
Hillcrest Park
Hilltop Park
Jackson Park
Jefferson Park
Madison Park
Marna Ridge Children's Forest
Marshall Park/Dubuque Arboretum & Botanical Gardens
Maus Park
McAleece Sports Complex
Medical Associates Greenbelt
Miller-Riverview Park
Murphy Park
Orange Park
Pinard Park
Pyatigorsk Park
Rocco Buda Jr. Park
Roosevelt Park
Southern Park
Teddy Bear Park
Valentine Park
Valley High Park
Veterans' Memorial Park
Waller-Cooper Park
Washington Park

Parks being developed

Eagle Valley Park 
Elmwood Green Park 
Port of Dubuque Park 
Riley Park
Southern Park
Usha Park 
Welu Park
Westbrook Park

Recreation

Trails

 Bee Branch Trails

Dubuque Jaycees Trail
Granger Creek Nature Trail
Heritage Trail
Mississippi Riverwalk
NW Arterial Trail
Southern Levee Trail

Other facilities
Bunker Hill Golf Course
E.B. Lyons Prairie & Woodland Preserve
Flora Park Swimming Pool
Four Mounds Estate
Nicholas J. Sutton Swimming Pool
Oakwood Park

See also
Urban park

References

External links
City of Dubuque: Parks Dept.
City parks map

 
Dubuque, Iowa